National Youth Choirs of Great Britain (NYCGB), formerly known as British Youth Choir and National Youth Choir, is a family of choirs for outstanding young singers, and those with outstanding potential, in the United Kingdom. It comprises a total of five choirs for around 900 young people between the ages of 9 and 25:
 National Youth Girls' Choir
 National Youth Boys' Choir (incorporating Cambiata Voices).
 National Youth Training Choir
 National Youth Choir
 National Youth Chamber Choir
NYCGB also has a number of additional programmes and schemes, including its two emerging artists programmes, the Fellowship and the Young Composers scheme, and its Learning & Engagement programme.

The organisation also has a strong community of over 1,000 former members, NYCGB Alumni, who often participate in performances alongside NYCGB's flagship choirs.

Background and performance history
Founded in 1983 by Carl Browning, National Youth Choirs of Great Britain (NYCGB) is the UK’s most exciting, innovative and accessible organisation for young choral singers. NYCGB inspires and empowers young people through the life-changing experience of singing together, is home to some of the best young singers in the world, and is a national champion for youth choral music.

NYCGB’s five choirs (National Youth Girls’ Choir of Great Britain, National Youth Boys’ Choir of Great Britain, National Youth Training Choir of Great Britain, National Youth Choir of Great Britain, and National Youth Chamber Choir of Great Britain) have a membership of over 800 young singers aged 9 to 25 from across the UK. Through residential courses and special projects, NYCGB provides its young people with the best choral training, teaching and collaborations possible: unbeatable opportunities to develop skills in music and performance, leadership and teamwork, and to grow in confidence and aspiration.

NYCGB choirs regularly give high-profile performances at venues and festivals such as the Royal Albert Hall, the Royal Festival Hall, Sage Gateshead, the Royal Concert Hall Nottingham, Edinburgh Festival, Snape Proms and the BBC Proms as well as at events of national significance. High-profile international artists NYCGB has worked with range from Daniel Barenboim to Kylie Minogue. The music it creates and performs encompasses a wide diversity of genres and vocal styles and NYCGB regularly creates and releases audio and video recordings on its own record label, NYCGB Digital, and online platforms. 

NYCGB passionately believe that all children and young people, regardless of background and circumstance, should be able to make music with others, and should have the opportunity to discover and explore their musical talent and achieve at the highest levels.

A major and growing strand of NYCGB’s work is its national Learning & Engagement programme which reaches over 3,500 young people each year. Working with regional music education hubs, schools and partner organisations including regional choirs and venues, NYCGB encourages more and more young people to sing together and pursue their passion and talent for singing at a regional and national level.

NYCGB also supports the development of emerging young professionals through its Fellowship programme for future choral leaders and performers and its Young Composers scheme.

Musical Directors & Conductors

Current Creative Director 
Lucy Hollins is due to be appointed Creative Director of NYCGB in Spring 2023, succeeding Ben Parry, who held the position from 2012 to 2022.

Current Principal Conductors 

 National Youth Choir & National Youth Chamber Choir: Ben Parry
 National Youth Girls' Choir: Joanna Tomlinson
 National Youth Boys' Choir: Lucy Joy Morris
 National Youth Training Choir: Greg Beardsell

Former Conductors & Musical Directors 

 Greg Hallam
 Robbie Jacobs
 Esther Jones
 Dominic Ellis Peckham
 Rachel Staunton

Recordings

NYCGB Digital 
NYCGB operates its own record label, NYCGB Digital, which releases music recorded by its choirs via Spotify, Apple Music, YouTube Music and other major music streaming services. The label publishes new recordings each month, which are regularly featured on playlists curated by each streaming platforms' editorial team, as well as being broadcast on national radio stations, including BBC Radio 3, Classic FM and Scala.

Notable releases include:

 Antiphon (by Jonathan Dove) - released April 2016
 Performed by National Youth Girls' Choir and National Youth Chamber Choir
 Conducted by Esther Jones
 Spem in Alium (by Thomas Tallis) - released September 2016
 Performed by National Youth Choir
 Conducted by Ben Parry
 Balleilaka (by A. R. Rahman arr. Ethan Sperry) - released September 2017
 Performed by National Youth Training Choir and Tarang Percussion Ensemble
 Conducted by Robbie Jacobs
 Hymn to the Fallen (by John Williams arr. Paul Lavender) - released November 2019
 Performed by National Youth Choir and Central Band of the Royal Air Force
 Conducted by Christopher l'Anson
 Shenandoah (arr. James Erb) - released August 2020
 Performed remotely by National Youth Choirs Alumni
 Conducted by Will Dawes

NMC Recordings partnership 
NYCGB also partners with NMC Recordings to produce its annual Young Composers albums: a set of pieces for National Youth Choir and NYCGB Fellows composed by NYCGB Young Composers.

 Young Composers 1, released January 2020
 Young Composers 2, released January 2021
 Young Composers 3, released January 2022
 Young Composers 4, released January 2023

Other notable recordings 
In addition to the recordings organised and produced by NYCGB and its partners, its choirs are regularly invited to take part in recording sessions with top orchestras and conductors. Recordings featuring NYCGB's choirs have been released on labels including EMI, Delphian, Decca, Signum, and Priory. These have included:

 Messiah...Refreshed!, with Royal Philharmonic Orchestra (recorded at Abbey Road Studios, released on Signum Classics)
 The Great War Symphony, with Royal Philharmonic Orchestra (recorded at Abbey Road Studios, released on Decca)
 Gloria - Te Deum, with Karl Jenkins and London Symphony Orchestra (released on Decca)
 The Armed Man: A Mass for Peace, with Karl Jenkins and London Philharmonic Orchestra (released on Decca)

Notable former members
 Lucy Bailey of the Swingle Singers
 Rich Batsford - Pianist, composer and singer-songwriter
James Burton - Conductor and Composer
 Stephen Connolly of the King's Singers
 Karen Danzig - Singer / songwriter
 John Daszak - Opera Singer
 Karen England of Opera Babes
 Joanna Goldsmith of the Swingle Singers
 Rae Hendrie - Actress
 Andrew Johnston - Came 3rd in Britain's Got Talent
 Louise Marshall - Singer with Jools Holland's Rhythm and Blues Orchestra
 Chris Neale of the Swingle Singers
 Wendy Nieper - formerly of the Swingle Singers
 Jon Robyns - West End star of Les Misérables and Avenue Q
 Ben Thapa of G4 (band)
 Henrik Wager of the Flying Pickets
 Laura Wright of All Angels

References

External links
 Official website 
Birmingham Post (15 April 2008). "Review: National Youth Choirs of Great Britain at Symphony Hall"

British choirs
National choirs
Youth choirs
Musical groups established in 1983
1983 establishments in the United Kingdom
Youth organisations based in the United Kingdom